The 1947  Texas A&M Aggies football team was an American football team that represented Texas A&M University in the Southwest Conference during the 1947 college football season. In its 14th season under head coach Homer H. Norton, the team compiled a 3–6–1 record (1–4–1 against conference opponents), tied for fifth place in the conference, and was outscored by a total of 185 to 169. The team played its home games at Kyle Field in College Station, Texas.

Schedule

References

Texas AandM
Texas A&M Aggies football seasons
Texas AandM Aggies football